Accretion/dilution analysis is a type of M&A financial modelling performed in the pre-deal phase to evaluate the effect of the transaction on shareholder value and to check whether EPS for buying shareholders will increase or decrease post-deal. Generally, shareholders do not prefer dilutive transactions; however, if the deal may generate enough value to become 
 accretive in a reasonable time, a proposed combination is justified. 

Aside is a simplified example. A real-life accretion/dilution analysis may be much more complex if the deal is structured as cash-and-stock-for-stock, if preferred shares and dilutive instruments are involved, if debt and transaction fees are substantial, and so on. Generally, if the buying company has a higher P/E multiple than that of the target, the deal is likely to be accretive. The reverse is true for a dilutive transaction.

See also
Post-money valuation
Pre-money valuation

References

External links
THE IMPACT OF EPS ACCRETION AND DILUTION ON STOCK PRICES
Valuation of a P&C Company
Example of A/D Analysis

Valuation (finance)
Corporate finance